The Spokane River Centennial Trail is a  paved trail in Eastern Washington for alternate transportation and recreational use. It is managed by Washington State Parks as the Spokane River Centennial State Park Trail.

The trail extends from Sontag Park in Nine Mile Falls, Washington to the Washington/Idaho border. The trail is divided into three sections: Riverside refers to the section of the trail within Riverside State Park, Urban refers to the section within the city of Spokane, and Valley refers the section east of Spokane (almost all of which lies in the Spokane Valley, hence the name). After the border into Idaho, the trail continues as the North Idaho Centennial Trail.

History

Following the Expo '74, advocates proposed a mixed use pathway along the river.  Citizens in Washington and Idaho expanded the idea by 1986 by joining forces and suggesting a much longer trail that could be completed in time to celebrate the respective state centennials of Washington (1989) and Idaho (1990). In 2010, it was designated a National Recreation Trail.

References

External links

Spokane River Centennial State Park Trail Washington State Parks and Recreation Commission
Spokane River Centennial State Park Trail Brochure Washington State Parks and Recreation Commission
Friends of the Centennial Trail

State parks of Washington (state)
Parks in Spokane County, Washington
Transportation in Washington (state)
Hiking trails in Washington (state)
Transportation in Spokane County, Washington
Tourist attractions in Spokane County, Washington
National Recreation Trails in Washington (state)